The 2011 Korean Baduk League began on 12 May 2011.

Teams

Hangame
Lee Younggu 
Yun Junsang
Jin Siyoung
Han Taehee
Ryu Jaehyeong
Lee Taehyun

Hite Jinro
Choi Cheol-han
An Kukhyun
Lee Chungyu
Kim Kiwon
Lee Wonyoung
An Sungjoon

Kixx
Park Junghwan
Cho Hanseung
Kim Kiyoung
Hong Sungji
Kim Daeyoung
Park Seunghwa

Netmarble
Lee Chang-ho
Won Seong-jin
Han Wonggyu
An Hyungjun
Lee Sanghoon
Kim Hyeongwoo

Posco LED
Kang Dongyun
Mok Jin-seok
Paek Hongsuk
On Sojin
Joo Hyeongwuk
Kim Hyungjun

Shinan Chunil Salt
Lee Sedol
An Choyoung
Han Sanghoon
Kang Seungmin
Lee Jungwoo
Kim Dongho

Tbroad
Heo Young-ho
Pak Yeong-hun
Kim Seongjae
Jin Donggyu
Lee Yongchan
Ko Geuntae

Yeongnam Ilbo
Kim Jiseok
Kang Yootaek
Park Jungsang
Lee Jihyun
Park Jinsol
Na Hyun

Standings

Results

References

2011 in go
Go competitions in South Korea